Motor Sich is a Ukrainian airline based in Zaporizhzhia, Ukraine. It operates passenger and cargo services, including charter and scheduled flights. Its main base is Zaporizhzhia International Airport.

History 
The airline was established in 1984 and is wholly owned by the Motor Sich Joint Stock Company, an aircraft-engine company. On 24 February 2022, Ukraine closed its airspace to civilian flights due to the Russian invasion. The airline has suspended all flights until further notice.

Destinations 
Belarus
 Minsk - Minsk National Airport (suspended following the diverting of Ryanair Flight 4978) 

Ukraine
 Kyiv - Kyiv Zhuliany International Airport
 Lviv - Lviv Danylo Halytskyi International Airport
 Mykolaiv - Mykolaiv Airport
 Odesa - Odesa International Airport
 Zaporizhzhia - Zaporizhzhia International Airport

Saudi Arabia
 Riyadh - King Khalid International Airport

Codeshare agreements 
Motor Sich Airlines has had a codeshare agreement with Belavia.

Fleet

Current fleet
As of November 2017, the Motor Sich fleet includes the following aircraft

Previously operated
The airline has also previously operated

5 Antonov An-26 registration (UR-26199 / UR-26016 / UR-26113 / UR-26598 / UR-BXF )
1 Antonov An-12 registration UR-48975

Accidents  
On 2 July 2022, an Antonov An-12 (registration number UR-11316) transporting military cargo from Istanbul, Turkey skidded the runway while landing in Uzhhorod Airport. The aircraft suffered light damage.

References

External links
Official website

Airlines of Ukraine
Airlines established in 1984
Companies based in Zaporizhzhia
Ukrainian brands
Motor Sich
1984 establishments in Ukraine